Heath railway station was a railway station in the village of Holmewood, Derbyshire. The station name of Heath was named after the neighbouring village of Heath although the station was in Holmewood instead.

The station was just before the Great Central Chesterfield Loop which ran between Staveley Central and Heath Junction (just north of Heath railway station) on the Great Central Main Line.

References

Disused railway stations in Derbyshire
Former Great Central Railway stations
Railway stations in Great Britain opened in 1893
Railway stations in Great Britain closed in 1963